Labor army is a term used in 1920 to describe Soviet soldiers who were moved from military jobs to physical labor jobs.

Labor army or Labor Army may also refer to:

Informal reference to NKVD labor columns, Soviet Union, 1941–1946
Reserve army of labour, a term invented by Karl Marx about the unemployed and under-employed in capitalist society

See also
Labour corps (disambiguation)
Labour battalion